Derakht-e Bid-e Olya (also Romanized as Derakht-e Bīd-e ‘Olyā; also known as Derakht-e Bīd-e Bālā) is a village in Golbibi Rural District, Marzdaran District, Sarakhs County, Razavi Khorasan Province, Iran. At the 2006 census, its population was 38, in 11 families.

References 

Populated places in Sarakhs County